Trio Bulgarka (also known as "Three Golden Coins", previously known as "Bulgarka Folk Trio") were a Bulgarian vocal ensemble. 

They gained international prominence through their contributions to the groundbreaking 1975 world music album Balkana: The music of Bulgaria, originally released on the now defunct Hannibal label. 

Their diversity of regional backgrounds enabled them to create a unique sound to their music. They recorded for record labels Bulgaria Balkanton and Hannibal in 1987. In 1988, their album The Forest Is Crying, produced by Joe Boyd was released. 

As part of the Bulgarian State Television Female Vocal Choir, they appeared on the album , Volume Two, which won a Grammy Award in 1989.

In 1989 they were featured on The Sensual World album by Kate Bush, on the songs "Deeper Understanding", "Never Be Mine", and "Rocket's Tail". In 1993 they appeared on another Kate Bush album, The Red Shoes, in the songs "You're the One", "The Song of Solomon", and "Why Should I Love You?", which also featured Prince. 

"I've never worked with women on such an intense creative level," Bush told the Los Angeles Times in January 1990, "and it was something strange to feel this very strong female energy in the studio. It was interesting to see the way the men in the studio reacted… Instead of just one female, there was a very strong female presence."

The trio disbanded at the end of the 1990s, and Eva Georgieva died in 2004.

Discography
Albums
 The Forest Is Crying (Lament For Indje Voivode), Hannibal Records, 1988 
 Bulgarka Vocal Trio, Balkanaton, 1989
 Folk Songs (Trio Bulgarka-Penev), Gega New, 1994

Contributing artist
The Sensual World – Kate Bush (1989)
The Red Shoes – Kate Bush (1993)
The Rough Guide to the Music of Eastern Europe (1999, World Music Network)

References

External links
MySpace page
Biography at AllMusic
Review of The Forest Is Crying at AllMusic
Excerpt from the book "Performing Democracy: Bulgarian Music and Musicians in Transition" by Donna A. Buchanan (Chapter 10) at the katebushnews.com forum

Bulgarian folk music groups